Wiriadinata Airport or Wiriadinata Airbase is a small airbase operated by Indonesian Air Force. Located at Cibeureum district, Tasikmalaya, West Java, Indonesia, the airport has one runway, with dimensions of 1,600 metres (5,249  ft) by 30 metres (98 ft) which allows the operation of aircraft up to ATR 72-600.

Airline and destinations

The following airlines offer scheduled passenger service:

Facilities 
 Telecommunication facilities (SSB, VHF) 
 Navigation facilities (NDB) 
 Facilities landing aids (PAPI, R / W Light) 
 Supporting aviation facilities and airport operations (generators, PLN) 
 Supporting facilities cost (windshock) 
 Space Arrival & Departure 
 Restroom & musholah

Statistics

References

tasikmalaya
Airports in West Java